The second season of Malcolm in the Middle premiered on November 5, 2000, on Fox, and ended on May 20, 2001, with a total of 25 episodes. Frankie Muniz stars as the title character Malcolm, and he is joined by Jane Kaczmarek, Bryan Cranston, Christopher Kennedy Masterson, Justin Berfield and Erik Per Sullivan.

Episodes

Cast and characters

Main 
 Frankie Muniz as Malcolm
 Jane Kaczmarek as Lois
 Bryan Cranston as Hal
 Christopher Kennedy Masterson as Francis
 Justin Berfield as Reese
 Erik Per Sullivan as Dewey

Recurring 
 Craig Lamar Traylor as Stevie Kenarban
 Catherine Lloyd Burns as Caroline Miller
 David Anthony Higgins as Craig Feldspar
 Daniel von Bargen as Commandant Edwin Spangler
 Drew Powell as Cadet Drew
 Eric Nenninger as Eric Hanson
 Evan Matthew Cohen as Lloyd
 Kasan Butcher as Joe
 Kyle Sullivan as Dabney
 Merrin Dungey as Kitty Kenarban
 Tania Raymonde as Cynthia Sanders

Production 
Main cast members Frankie Muniz, Jane Kaczmarek, Bryan Cranston, Christopher Kennedy Masterson, Justin Berfield and Erik Per Sullivan return as Malcolm, Lois, Hal, Francis, Reese and Dewey respectively. Catherine Lloyd Burns, who portrayed Caroline Miller as a regular in season one, appeared in only two episodes of season two due to being pregnant, and left the series after giving birth. The episode "Bowling" alternates between two storylines with the same characters, taking inspiration from Sliding Doors, and uses several split screens.

Release

Broadcast history 
The season premiered on November 5, 2000 on Fox, and ended on May 20, 2001 with a total of 25 episodes.

Home media 
The season was set to be released on Region 1 DVD in the fall of 2003, but was cancelled due to high costs of music clearances. It was released on Region 2 DVD on November 19, 2012, and Region 4 DVD on September 4, 2013.

Reception 
David Bianculli, writing for New York Daily News, said the season was "genuinely goofy right from the start". Steve Johnson of Chicago Tribune said it "is certainly a family program, and a first-rate one, but it's not at all traditional. Viewers accustomed to sitcom conventions will have a hard time with "Malcolm's" breakneck pace and lack of laugh track or theatrical stage." Mike Lipton of People wrote,"With parents as manic as these, how can Malcolm (Frankie Muniz) and his brothers possibly vie for attention? They can’t, but that’s okay. It’s the sight of adults behaving badly that fuels this show’s delightful anarchy." Alan Pergament of The Buffalo News said, "Muniz still is adorable as Malcolm. But, unlike Bart, he is growing up before our eyes and that charm probably only has a few more seasons to run."

The episode "Bowling" won two Primetime Emmy Awards for Outstanding Directing and Writing for a Comedy Series for Todd Holland and Alex Reid, respectively, in 2001. Leading on from this, Holland won the Directors Guild of America Award for Outstanding Directing – Comedy Series in 2002. Frankie Muniz was nominated for the Primetime Emmy Award for Outstanding Lead Actor in a Comedy Series for this episode.

References 

2000 American television seasons
2001 American television seasons
Malcolm in the Middle